Triumph Studios is a Dutch video game developer based in Delft, founded in 1997. The studio is known for their Age of Wonders and Overlord series and has developed several games for the PC, Xbox 360 and PlayStation 3. The company is known for Age of Wonders, a strategy game series released starting in 1999, and the action-adventure games Overlord and Overlord 2, released in 2007 and 2009, respectively, using its in-house Creator engine for development.

In June 2017 Paradox Interactive announced that it had acquired Triumph Studios. The deal was worth around $4.5 million dollars (4 million euros). Triumph became a fourth major Paradox studio, while also becoming its first outside of Sweden.

Games

References

External links
 

Video game companies established in 1997
Video game development companies
Video game companies of the Netherlands
Companies based in South Holland
Delft
2017 mergers and acquisitions
Dutch companies established in 1997
Paradox Interactive